Barrington King (1930–2006) was a career Foreign Service Officer who served as the first United States Ambassador to Brunei from 1984 to 1987. 

King studied at the University of Georgia and received a degree in art.  King entered the Foreign Service in 1957, and had postings in Egypt, Tanzania, Cyprus, Greece, Tunisia, and Pakistan.  He was appointed as Ambassador to Brunei by President Ronald Reagan on April 12, 1984, presented his credentials on May 28 of the same year and had his mission terminated on April 30, 1987. He was replaced by Thomas C. Ferguson.

References

1930 births
2006 deaths
United States Foreign Service personnel
University of Georgia alumni
Ambassadors of the United States to Brunei